Robert M. Wilson Jr. (April 28, 1952 – August 3, 2012) was an Arkansas lawyer.

Biography

Early life and education
Robert M. Wilson Jr. (Robby Wilson)  was born in Little Rock, Arkansas on April 28, 1952. His father, now deceased, Bob Wilson, a World War II veteran and Air Force pilot, spent a career in building and banking and, to this day, remains active in both careers. His grandfather, Winston P. Wilson Sr., originally from Tennessee, had been the President of Ouachita Baptist College in Arkadelphia, Arkansas, an author, an adventurer, and once ran for governor. His company is called "The Wilson Company, Inc." and is still run by his Winston's family.  Robert's great uncle, Winston P. (Wimpy) Wilson Jr., joined the military very early, served in World War II and was instrumental in the creation of the National Guard Bureau in America. He was inducted posthumously into the Aviation Hall of Fame in 2000. In 1960, Robert's brother, Charles Arthur Wilson, was born in Little Rock.

Wilson attended pre-school and elementary school at the Anthony School. He then attended Forest Heights Junior High and Hall High School, graduating in 1970 (receiving no honors). During those years he attended, intermittently, boarding and military schools. In the summer of 1970, he enlisted in the Arkansas Air National Guard and attended basic training at Lackland Air Force Base in San Antonio, Texas. Upon its successful conclusion, he then enrolled at the University of Arkansas (spring semester 1971), where he pledged Kappa Sigma fraternity and lived in the Fraternity House. He was initiated in the fall of 1971 and received the designation of "Model Pledge".

In June 1972, he moved to Washington, DC to work on the staff of Arkansas Senator John McClellan, where he was employed on the "Senator's Only" elevator in the U.S. Capitol through "patronage" employment. This was during the very exciting Watergate Hearings and he met several young and promising attorneys soon to be famous, such as Fred Thompson (later Senator from Tennessee and movie star) and Hillary Rodham. There he attended American University.

In the fall of 1973, Robert returned to the University of Arkansas and graduated with a BA, majoring in political science in 1975. His academic requirements necessary for his degree was completed in August 1974, so that he could enter law school that same month. Robert began law school in August 1974, where he remained until graduation in the spring of 1977.  Robert was a member of Phi Alpha Delta fraternity and served two terms as Treasurer of the Student Bar Association. In 1976, he was honorably discharged from the Arkansas Air National Guard having dutifully completed his term of enlistment. In July 1977, he unsuccessfully sat for the bar, passing it in the spring of 1978. Wilson & Associates was founded at that time.

Career
Wilson's career spans 4 decades.  Originally organized as Robert M Wilson, Jr, PA and in partnership with other Professional Associations (PA's) he practiced law in Little Rock, Arkansas, from 1978 until 1979 as a member of "Hamilton, O'Hara and Hays".  Founded by Senior Partner, Mr. William P. Hamilton Jr., (Wilson's early mentor) it included the future Mayor of North Little Rock, Patrick Henry Hays. From 1979 until 1982, the firm was called, Hamilton, Mackey, Wilson, Johnson and Wood. Becoming an established Pulaski, County Arkansas full service law firm. The partners exhibited client and bar approval on both sides of the Arkansas River in Little Rock and North Little Rock. Former Little Rock Mayor, Frank Mackey brought political depth and influence to the young firm. In 1982, the firm transitioned once again, from a full service general practice representing numerous different kinds of diverse interests to one of a limited practice with real estate and tax related matters as its focus.  The firm, then called Wilson & Wood was built upon Wilson's cornerstone relationship with Union National Bank of Little Rock and David Wood's well respected tax law practice.  Joining them the following year was the experienced trial lawyer, David Hargis, the trio practiced as Wilson, Wood and Hargis for three years. Foreseeing ever increasing client conflicts arising between their growing practices, the trio amiably parted ways in the fall of 1985 and Wilson, changed the name of his practice from, Robert M Wilson Jr PA to Wilson & Associates PLLC and so it has remained through the current time.

1n 2008, Wilson left the full-time daily practice of law but has remained in active temporary practice with his firms.

Wilson History & Research Center
In January 2008, Wilson founded the Wilson History and Research Center, a non-profit lending institution dedicated to locating, acquiring, authenticating and disseminating headgear of the 20th Century. Launching this virtual museum allowed Wilson to concentrate his energy on developing the underlying core relationships which will take the Sec. 501(c)3 not for profit foundation forward as a principal center for research and study regarding the development of military headgear of all nations in the 20th century.  The vision of the foundation and indeed of Wilson himself is that the Center will reach out to every person interested in these specific studies.  The virtual museum acquires examples of the nearly 10 million unique pieces which were designed, approved and manufactured, by direct purchase, charitable gift or consent of the owner to publish their gallery within the structure of the web site.  As of January 2013, after Robby's death, the museum is unfortunately in the process of closing its doors.  Robby's goal of collecting and disseminating 10 million unique pieces was not achieved.

Gift of Piper
On May 24, 2009, Wilson donated a completely restored Piper L-3 Grasshopper, spotter plane to the renowned D-Day Museum, dedicated to the paratroopers of the US, Musee-Airborne  in St. Marie Eglise, Normandy, France.  Captivated a year earlier by the description of this venerated museum's charter, by Patrick Brunel, the Museum's Curator, Wilson, embarked upon a personal quest to locate not only an authentic Piper Cub, but one whose serial number would indicate that the plane could easily have been involved in the invasion of Europe.  Luck being on his side, Wilson soon found and acquired a perfect example in Saarbruken, German and acquired it from Herr, Bernard Gross, its owner.  The gift was a part of the 65th D-Day remembrance and in most part was in Wilson's words, an "attempt to honor the memory of those who gave so much so that we may have our freedom."

XRF Technology
In addition to the many activities that WHRC is involved the organization was instrumental in the endorsement of X-Ray Fluorescence technology into the world of collecting steel helmets.  The process pioneered by David May of Florida helps point to authentic versus counterfeit military helmets. it is estimated that nearly one out of every five collectable helmets sold were reproductions sold as authentic.  Bringing the light of science upon this dark practice, it is hoped, will clear the false and fraudulent pieces from the archives of the world and bring relative confidence that what is being offered by enthusiasts and museums alike are real and authentic.

Children
Robert Wilson has two children, Robert M. Wilson, III, born in 1987, and Jillian Herrick Wilson, born in 1989. Robert currently serves as a Deputy Prosecutor for Pulaski County, Arkansas.  Jillian is an attorney with Wilson & Associates, PLLC, where she practices real estate law in Little Rock, Arkansas.

Philanthropy
Wilson has always felt that active participation in the development of social and professional responsibility is the concomitant obligation of the benefit of education, professional development and personal stability.  His theory of giving back to any organization or institution "more than it gives to you" is the cornerstone of his philanthropy.

Jazz - Beginning as a DJ at the University of Arkansas, Fayetteville, in 1973, Wilson has been a lifelong advocate of increasing the understanding and enjoyment in this musical art form.  Working with premier Jazz drummer Dave Rogers, in Little Rock, Wilson funded 16 years of developmental extemporaneous jazz performances.  The Monday Night Jazz Project at the afterthought, brought hundreds of musicians together in Little Rock and became the fundamental measure for a young musician stepping up into the role of Jazzman.  Wilson received the 2010 Jazzman of the Year award for his efforts from the Arkansas Jazz Heritage Foundation.  The 16-year project came to an end in May 2011.

Cancer - In March 2010 Wilson was diagnosed with terminal esophageal cancer.  After treatment at the Winthrop P Rockefeller Cancer Treatment Center at the University of Arkansas Medical School in Little Rock he was found in January 2010 to be cancer free.  He was named as one of the Faces of Cancer for 2011 by the American Cancer Society and has participated in continuing the development of growing awareness of this illness.  In April, 2011 additional cancer was found and surgically removed.  Wilson devoted a large percentage of his last days to Cancer Awareness and recovery and the hope that Cancer could be cured.

Licenses
Arkansas State and Federal Courts, 1978
United States Supreme Court, 1986
Texas State Courts, 1991
Tennessee State Courts, 1996

Published works
Author:
Act 57 of 1987 (Statutory Foreclosure)
Act 15 of 1988 Extraordinary Session (Super Lien)
Act 983 of 1999 (numerous statutory foreclosure amendments)
Various publications, textbooks and treatises on mortgage and real estate law in the State of Arkansas

Most Recent Articles:
"Arkansas Electronic Records & Signatures Act" - Featured in the USFN Report, Jul-Aug 2000 issue
"Private Communications - Attorney-Client Privilege: Do You Still Have One?" - Featured in the USFN Report, Jul & Aug 2001 & The Daily Record, Aug 2001
"Arkansas Ventures Into Cyber Notice" - The USFN Report, May-Jun 2001; also featured as "Arkansas Ventures Into Internet Notice" - Servicing Management, Aug 2001

Books 
Exotische: Rare Cloth Headgear of the Third Reich, with co-author Paul Sack

Awards
 Mortgage Bankers of Arkansas President's Award of Excellence (1987–1988 and 1993–1994)

References

1952 births
2012 deaths
Arkansas lawyers
Lawyers from Little Rock, Arkansas
University of Arkansas alumni
Hall High School (Arkansas) alumni
20th-century American lawyers